The Grogan Medal is an Australian rules football award given to the best and fairest player in home and away rounds of each season's QAFL/Queensland State League competition. From 2011 to present it is awarded to the best and fairest player in the North East Australian Football League Northern Conference. It was first awarded under the present name in 1946, previously being known as the De Little Medal.

Winners

See also

References

External links

Sportingpulse: Grogan Medal winners

Australian rules football awards
Australian rules football in Queensland
Australian rules football-related lists